The  Corpus Christi Hammerheads season was the team's seventh season as a professional indoor football franchise and second in the Indoor Football League (IFL). One of twenty-five teams competing in the IFL for the 2010 season, the Corpus Christi, Texas-based Corpus Christi Hammerheads were members of the Lonestar East Division of the Intense Conference.

Under the leadership of head coach Stephen Fillmore, the team played their home games at the American Bank Center in Corpus Christi, Texas.

The Hammerheads lost to the Arkansas Diamonds 29-44 in the Intense Conference quarterfinals.

Schedule

Regular season

Playoffs

Standings

Roster

References

External links
Corpus Christi Hammerheads official statistics

Corpus Christi Hammerheads
Corpus Christi Hammerheads